The Cabuçu River is a river situated in South Eastern Brazil within the state of Rio de Janeiro.

See also
List of rivers of Rio de Janeiro

References
Brazilian Ministry of Transport

Rivers of Rio de Janeiro (state)